In mathematics, the Mohr–Mascheroni theorem states that any geometric construction that can be performed by a compass and straightedge can be performed by a compass alone.

It must be understood that by "any geometric construction", we are referring to figures that contain no straight lines, as it is clearly impossible to draw a straight line without a straightedge. It is understood that a line is determined provided that two distinct points on that line are given or constructed, even though no visual representation of the line will be present. The theorem can be stated more precisely as:
 Any Euclidean construction, insofar as the given and required elements are points (or circles), may be completed with the compass alone if it can be completed with both the compass and the straightedge together.

Though the use of a straightedge can make a construction significantly easier, the theorem shows that any set of points that fully defines a constructed figure can be determined with compass alone, and the only reason to use a straightedge is for the aesthetics of seeing straight lines, which for the purposes of construction is functionally unnecessary.

History 
The result was originally published by Georg Mohr in 1672, but his proof languished in obscurity until 1928.  The theorem was independently discovered by Lorenzo Mascheroni in 1797 and it was known as Mascheroni's Theorem until Mohr's work was rediscovered.

Several proofs of the result are known. Mascheroni's proof of 1797 was generally based on the idea of using reflection in a line as the major tool. Mohr's solution was different. In 1890, August Adler published a proof using the inversion transformation.

An algebraic approach uses the isomorphism between the Euclidean plane and the real coordinate space . In this way, a stronger version of the theorem was proven in 1990. It also shows the dependence of the theorem on Archimedes' axiom (which cannot be formulated in a first-order language).

Constructive proof

Outline 
To prove the theorem, each of the basic constructions of compass and straightedge need to be proven to be possible by using a compass alone, as these are the foundations of, or elementary steps for, all other constructions. These are:
Creating the line through two existing points
Creating the circle through one point with centre another point
Creating the point which is the intersection of two existing, non-parallel lines
Creating the one or two points in the intersection of a line and a circle (if they intersect)
Creating the one or two points in the intersection of two circles (if they intersect).

#1 - A line through two points

It is understood that a straight line cannot be drawn without a straightedge. A line is considered to be given by any two points, as any such pair define a unique line. In keeping with the intent of the theorem which we aim to prove, the actual line need not be drawn but for aesthetic reasons.

#2 - A circle through one point with defined center

This can be done with a compass alone. A straightedge is not required for this.

#5 - Intersection of two circles

This construction can also be done directly with a compass.

#3, #4 - The other constructions

Thus, to prove the theorem, only compass-only constructions for #3 and #4 need to be given.

Notation and remarks 
The following notation will be used throughout this article.

In general constructions there are often several variations that will produce the same result. The choices made in such a variant can be made without loss of generality. However, when a construction is being used to prove that something can be done, it is not necessary to describe all these various choices and, for the sake of clarity of exposition, only one variant will be given below. However, many constructions come in different forms depending on whether or not they use circle inversion and these alternatives will be given if possible.

It is also important to note that some of the constructions proving the Mohr-Mascheroni theorem require the arbitrary placement of points in space, such as finding the center of a circle when not already provided (see construction below). In some construction paradigms - such as in the geometric definition of the constructible number - this may be prohibited. In such a paradigm, however, for example, circles without their centers will not be provided by hypothesis, thus there is no issue.

Some preliminary constructions 
To prove the above constructions #3 and #4, which are included below, a few necessary intermediary constructions are also explained below since they are used and referenced frequently. These are also compass-only constructions. All constructions below rely on #1,#2,#5, and any other construction that is listed prior to it.

Compass equivalence theorem (circle translation) 

The ability to translate, or copy, a circle to a new center is vital in these proofs and fundamental to establishing the veracity of the theorem. The creation of a new circle with the same radius as the first, but centered at a different point, is the key feature distinguishing the collapsing compass from the modern, rigid compass. With the rigid compass this is a triviality, but with the collapsing compass it is a question of construction possibility.  The equivalence of a collapsing compass and a rigid compass was proved by Euclid (Book I Proposition 2 of The Elements) using straightedge and collapsing compass when he, essentially, constructs a copy of a circle with a different center. This equivalence can also be established with compass alone, a proof of which can be found in the main article.

Reflecting a point across a line 

 Given a line segment  and a point  not on the line determined by that segment,  construct the image of  upon reflection across this line.
 If  (that is, there is a unique point of intersection of the two circles), then  is its own reflection and lies on the line  (contrary to the assumption), and the two circles are internally tangential.

Extending the length of a line segment

Given a line segment  find a point  on the line  such that  is the midpoint of line segment .
(∆ABD is an equilateral triangle.)
(∆DBE is an equilateral triangle.)
(∆EBC is an equilateral triangle, and the three angles at  show that  are collinear.)

This construction can be repeated as often as necessary to find a point  so that the length of line segment  = ⋅ length of line segment  for any positive integer .

Inversion in a circle 

Naturally there is no inversion for a point .
 Draw a circle  (in red). 
if the circles do not intersect in two points see below for an alternative construction.

The point  is now obtained by extending  so that  = .

Determining the center of a circle through three points

 Reflect  in the line  to the point .

Intersection of two non-parallel lines (construction #3) 

 Select circle  of arbitrary radius whose center  does not lie on either line.
Find the center  of this circle.
Find the center  of this circle.

Intersection of a line and a circle (construction #4) 
The compass-only construction of the intersection points of a line and a circle breaks into two cases depending upon whether the center of the circle is or is not collinear with the line.

Circle center is not collinear with the line 
Assume that center of the circle does not lie on the line.

Given a circle  (in black) and a line .
(See above.)
 Under the assumption of this case, .
Construct a circle  (in red). (See above, compass equivalence.)
 If the two circles are (externally) tangential then .
 If  then the line is tangential to the circle .

An alternate construction, using circle inversion can also be given.
Given a circle  and a line .
 Construct circle , which represents the inversion of the line  into circle .
 If the two circles are (internally) tangential then , and the line is also tangential.

Circle center is collinear with the line 

( is the fourth vertex of parallelogram .)
( is the fourth vertex of parallelogram .)

Thus it has been shown that all of the basic construction one can perform with a straightedge and compass can be done with a compass alone, provided that it is understood that a line cannot be literally drawn but merely defined by two points.

Other types of restricted construction 
Renaissance mathematicians Lodovico Ferrari, Gerolamo Cardano and Niccolò Fontana Tartaglia and others were able to show in the 16th century that any ruler-and-compass construction could be accomplished with a straightedge and a fixed-width compass (i.e. a rusty compass).

Motivated by Mascheroni's result, in 1822 Jean Victor Poncelet conjectured a variation on the same theme. He proposed that any construction possible by straightedge and compass could be done with straightedge alone.  The one stipulation though is that a single circle with its center identified must be provided. This statement, now known as the Poncelet-Steiner theorem,  was proved by Jakob Steiner eleven years later.  

A proof later provided in 1904 by Francesco Severi relaxes the requirement that one full circle be provided, and shows that any small arc of the circle, so long as the center is still provided, is still sufficient.

Additionally, the center itself may be omitted instead of portions of the arc, if it is substituted for something else sufficient, such as a second concentric or intersecting circle, or a third circle, or a non-intersecting second circle provided a point on either the centerline or the radial axis between them is given.

The compass equivalency theorem shows that in all the constructions mentioned above, the familiar modern compass with its fixable aperture, which can be used to transfer distances, may be replaced with a "collapsible compass", a compass that collapses whenever it is lifted from a page, so that it may not be directly used to transfer distances. Indeed, Euclid's original constructions use a collapsible compass.

See also 

 Napoleon's problem
 Geometrography
 Inversive geometry

Notes

References

Further reading

External links
 Construction with the Compass Only

Compass and straightedge constructions
Theorems in plane geometry